Yushin High School is a private high school located in Wooman-dong, Paldal-gu Suwon, Gyeonggi Province, Republic of Korea.

School history 

 The school was founded on March 12, 1973, had its first entrance ceremony and created a soccer team. On July 28, 1972, the school became the initial school for the Yushin Institute. The first president was Chang-won Park. On November 22, 1972, Lee Kyung-Suk became the first principal.
 The first class graduated on January 19, 1976.
 On December 30, 1976, a dormitory was completed (343 m2). It was extended in 1977.
 On May 30, 1978, the library was completed (with a floor space of 991 m2).
 The tennis club started on March 5, 1980, followed by a baseball team on April 14, 1984.
 On May 4, 1984, it was completed of the construction of the Hwaseongwan Hall (562 m2).
 On October 30, 1990, the welfare center was completed.
 In 2017, Kim Young-hoo became the fourth chairman of the Yushin Institute.

References

High schools in South Korea
Schools in Suwon
Boys' schools in South Korea